W.O.A Entertainment Group (formerly known as W.O.A Records & Studios) is a global music company that pioneered independent music in India and Dubai. It was established in 1998 by musician and filmmaker Oliver Sean. W.O.A Entertainment has been involved in animal welfare. Several WOA albums like the Goa Chillout Zone series sales go towards animal welfare projects, including groups against fur trade. WOA Entertainment is an MTV EMA Nominated Label with several billboard top 10 and iTunes No.1 releases.

The group has multiple sub-divisions, such as WOA Records & Studios, WOA Films, WOAFM99 Radio Show, and WOA TV Show

Sub-divisions

W.O.A Records & Studios 

W.O.A Records is the record label division that has over 200 artists signed to the roster. Throughout the years, W.O.A International, which is the music publishing division of WOA Records, has signed names such as Danny John, Demetrius, Cherie Nichole, Raveena, and Diego Ramirez. Also, there are over 1000 albums and titles licensed for distribution in India. Among others, this label has released music compilations called Goa Chillout Zone Series and the Independent No.1's Series. W.O.A Records is also the division that promotes & markets the Annual W.O.A Records India Tour and music festival and the W.O.A International Dubai Music Fest. Genres covered by the recording label range from World, Jazz and Rock to Metal, Reggae and Irish Gypsy Jazz.

The Independent No.1's Compilation 

The Independent No.1's Compilation has been one of the most successful compilation projects for W.O.A Records. Independent No.1's Vol.4 was selected by the recording academy for 'Best Packaging' in the 58th Grammy Nomination Ballots. Volume 2 got to the top of the Album charts in India and Volume 3 featured three major radio hits with one of them charting on the Vh1 TOP 10.

Goa Chillout Zone 

Goa Chillout Zone is a successful compilation that, among other things, has hit No.1 on the iTunes UK electronic album charts in February 2020 (Vol.9). The compilation has been featured on Album Charts in India (Volume 2), hit top 10 Mobile Download Charts (Volume 5), and had artists being selected by Universal Music Australia for World Chill Cafe compilation. The latest Goa Chillout Zone has hit #1 on the Amazon Hot New Releases Charts and iTunes Top 10 in the United Kingdom

Christmas Special 

Independent No.1's Christmas Special Edition is usually released at the beginning of December. In the past, there have been songs by Richard Krueger, Christine VanHoy, The Rich Collective, Silent Stranger, and others. The compilation has been available on iTunes, Google Play, Amazon, and other platforms.

W.O.A Films 

The production company focuses mainly on music videos, independent films, movie trailers, corporate videos, web commercials, and concert visuals. W.O.A Film productions include documentaries on Vh1, syndicated TV-shows, TV-commercials, and music videos. As a company, W.O.A Films handles video, film, music, and audio production as well as post-production activities.

W.O.AFM99 Radio Show 

W.O.AFM99 is a weekly radio show hosted by Oliver Sean. It's distributed to commercial networks in India and the Middle East. Also, its distribution system covers Public Radio, PRX, and various online shows and podcasts. The radio show accepts submissions before each new season and doesn't have any genre restrictions. The show is interactive as listeners can converse with artists who appear on the show. This one hour syndicated radio show was launched in 2009. W.O.A Radio was being planned a few years before the launch, but was put on hold due to expansion of W.O.A International's other divisions.

W.O.A TV Show 
W.O.A TV Show is featuring independent music videos, live concerts, and artist specials. The show has partners both on satellite and cable TV, which means that the series gets covered across the Middle East and Asia. W.O.A TV Show is supported by three cable TV partners and four satellite networks. Also, it's being broadcast online, for example iTunes podcasts. The general public knows the show under the name "ALL THING MUSIC".

W.O.A International Music Festival 
W.O.A International Music Festival is a music festival organized annually alongside a tour covering Indian sub-continent. The first W.O.A Records India Tour was held in 2008, representing genres from electronica and jazz to folk and rock. Main line-up consisted of Oliver Sean, Jesus Aaron and Sparky Quano. The annual tour brings together international independent artists to perform for Indian audiences. One of the results of this tour is artists getting more attention and leverage. WOA has now introduced the WOA Summer Tour UK, the first of which was held from July to August 2019

References

External links
"Official WOA Records Website"
"Official WOA Entertainment Group Website"

Entertainment companies of India